Will the Wolf Survive is an album by American country music artist Waylon Jennings. It was released in 1986 as his debut for MCA Records.

Recording and composition
Will the Wolf Survive was Jennings' first release on MCA after moving from RCA, where he had recorded since 1966.  His debut album with the label was produced by Jimmy Bowen, who updated the singer's sound from the outlaw country sound that some critics felt had gone stale on albums like Black on Black and It's Only Rock & Roll.  Drug-free for nearly two years, the album was a fresh start for Jennings, who had seen his commercial standing slip in recent years after ruling the country charts for most of the 1970s and early 1980s.  Jennings, who resurfaced in the public consciousness as part of the successful Highwaymen collaboration with fellow outlaws Willie Nelson, Kris Kristofferson, and Johnny Cash, embraced the changes to his sound after spending many years fighting the Nashville system for the right to produce his own records and use his own band in the studio.  Jennings later noted, "Compared with some of my earlier works, it might not have fit people's expectations of me.  That was the point."  However, in his 1996 memoir Waylon, Jennings cited his own lack of confidence as a major obstacle during the sessions:

It was the first time in years I'd recorded without my band...I didn't play guitar on the sessions; I was a 'vocalist.'  Nor did I write any of the songs...I was trying to sound like what I thought he [Bowen] wanted me to sound like instead of me.  I'd think, what the hell, I sang that good, and in the end, I was imitating myself, trying too hard to satisfy people who thought I had ruined my music by straightening up. Bowen knew that.  It was all down to me.

Featuring more elaborate musical arrangements than the stripped down, hard-driving records he had become famous for, Will the Wolf Survive was recorded digitally.  It proved a greater commercial success than the singer's previous several releases, the peak of Jennings' popularity having passed.  Some tracks, such as "Where Does Love Go" and "Suddenly Single," have a glossy, contemporary sound typical of Bowen at the time that dates them to an extent, but Jennings singing is characteristically strong.  The well-known title track, originally performed by Los Lobos, was the album's most successful single, reaching #5 on the country charts, and can be interpreted as Jennings' own personal statement about his past battles with the music industry and his own ongoing sobriety.  The theme of sobriety is also explored on "Working Without a Net," which reached #7 on the charts and finds the singer contemplating touring without the crutch of drugs ("Up on the high wire, the crowd begins to call/Some want you to fly, some want to see you fall").  "What'll You Do When I'm Gone" also made the Top 10, peaking at #8.   Steve Earle's "The Devil's Right Hand", first performed on this album, would go on to be covered once more by Jennings, this time with the Highwaymen, on 1995's The Road Goes on Forever.

Reception
Will the Wolf Survive topped the Billboard country albums chart in 1986, Jennings' first LP to do so since 1980's Music Man.  AllMusic deems it "one of his better albums."

Track listing

"Will the Wolf Survive?" (David Hidalgo, Louie Pérez) – 3:29
"They Ain't Got 'Em All" (John Scott Sherrill) – 2:44
"Working Without a Net" (Don Cook, John Barlow Jarvis, Gary Nicholson) – 2:42
"Where Does Love Go" (Steve Bogard, Rick Giles) – 2:16
"That Dog Won't Hunt" (Roger Murrah, John Schweers) – 2:55
"What You'll Do When I'm Gone" (Larry Butler) – 2:57
"Suddenly Single" (Troy Seals, Max D. Barnes) – 2:46
"The Shadow of Your Distant Friend" (Murrah, Steve Dean) – 4:01
"I've Got Me a Woman" (Paul Kennerley) – 2:44
"The Devil's Right Hand" (Steve Earle) – 3:28

Personnel

Musicians
Waylon Jennings - lead vocals, backing vocals
Richard Bennett, Gary Scruggs, Billy Joe Walker Jr. - acoustic guitar
Jerry Bridges - bass guitar
Matt Betton - drums
John Barlow Jarvis - DX-7
Richard Bennett, Billy Joe Walker Jr., Reggie Young - electric guitar
Gary Scruggs - harmonica
Mark O'Connor - mandolin
John Barlow Jarvis - piano
Hollis Halford, Mart Morse - Synclavier
David Innis - synthesizer
Gary Scruggs - 12-string electric guitar

Production
Produced By Waylon Jennings & Jimmy Bowen
Production Assistant: Chip Hardy
Engineers: Bob Bullock, Mark J. Coddington, Russ Martin, Willie Pevear, Robbie Rose & Ron Treat
Mixing: Bob Bullock
Digital Editing: Milan Bogdan
Mastering (Master Tape Preparation): Glenn Meadows

Chart performance

References

Waylon Jennings albums
1986 albums
MCA Records albums
Albums produced by Jimmy Bowen